"Rave Alert" is a song written and recorded by Belgian musician Praga Khan. It is a version of his earlier song "Rave Alarm" with additional vocals by Jade 4 U. It was featured on A Spoonful of Miracle and Conquers Your Love.

Track listing
 "Rave Alert!" (Full Alert Radio Version) – 3:46	
 "Rave Alert!" (Full Alert Mix) – 5:12	
 "Rave Alert!" (Over the Mountain Mix) – 5:11	
 "Rave Alert!" (Into the Valley Mix) – 5:09	
 "Rave Alert!" (Full Vocal Alert) – 5:05

Charts

References

1992 singles
1992 songs
Praga Khan songs